Citheronia hamifera is a species of moth in the family Saturniidae first described by Walter Rothschild in 1907. It is found in Trinidad, Peru, Guyana, French Guiana, Argentina, Bolivia, Ecuador and Brazil.

Adults are reddish-black, with wingspans which may reach 15cm.

Subspecies
Citheronia hamifera hamifera (Trinidad, Guyana)
Citheronia hamifera bodoquena Travassos & Rêgo-Barros, 1966

References

Moths described in 1907
Ceratocampinae